Kuet Chang is a tambon (subdistrict) of Mae Taeng District, in Chiang Mai Province, Thailand. In 2020 it had a total population of 5,569 people.

Administration

Central administration
The tambon is subdivided into 8 administrative villages (muban).

Local administration
The whole area of the subdistrict is covered by the subdistrict administrative organization (SAO) Kuet Chang (องค์การบริหารส่วนตำบลกื้ดช้าง).

References

External links
Thaitambon.com on Kuet Chang

Tambon of Chiang Mai province
Populated places in Chiang Mai province